Song Aiguo (born 1954) is a retired Chinese Ambassador.

From 1979 to 1984 he was Third Secretary in the Department of West Asian and North African Affairs, in the Ministry of Foreign Affairs of the People's Republic of China
From 1984 to 1990 he was Third Secretary, Second Secretary, First Secretary in Ankara.
From 1990 to 1993 he was  deputy director, Director, Department of West Asian and North African Affairsin the Ministry of Foreign Affairs of the People's Republic of China.
From 1993 to 1996 he was Counselor, in Ankara.
From 1996 to 2000 he was Counselor, Deputy Director-General, Depart of West Asian and North African Affairs,  in the Ministry of Foreign Affairs of the People's Republic of China.
From 2000 to 2003 he was ambassador in Nicosia (Cyprus).
From 2003 to 2006 he was ambassador in Ankara (Turkey).
From 2006 to 2010 he was Director-General, Department of West Asian and North African Affairs,  in the Ministry of Foreign Affairs of the People's Republic of China.
Since October 2010 he is ambassador in Cairo and Representative to the Arab League.

References

1954 births
Living people
Diplomats of the People's Republic of China
Ambassadors of China to Cyprus
Ambassadors of China to Turkey
Ambassadors of China to Egypt